Draba extensa is a species of flowering plant in the family Brassicaceae. It is found only in Ecuador.
Its natural habitat is rocky areas. It is threatened by habitat loss.

References

extensa
Flora of Ecuador
Endangered plants
Taxonomy articles created by Polbot